George Franklin Cooper was a captain in the United States Navy. He was the commanding officer of the battleship  from May 1914 to June 1916.

Biography
He was appointed to the US Navy in 1872.

References

United States Navy officers
Year of birth missing
Year of death missing